John Bennet, 1st Baron Ossulston (1616 – 11 February 1695) was an English politician who sat in the House of Commons from 1663 to 1679. He was created Baron Ossulston in 1682.

Life
Bennet was the eldest son of Sir John Bennet of Dawley, Harlington, Middlesex and his wife Dorothy Crofts. He was baptised on 5 July 1616. He matriculated at Pembroke College, Oxford on 24 April 1635, aged about 17 and was a student of Gray's Inn in 1636. In 1658, he succeeded his father to the estate of Dawley in Harlington. He was made a Knight of the Bath on 23 April 1661 at the coronation of Charles II and was Lieutenant of the Gentlemen Pensioners.

In 1663 Bennet was elected Member of Parliament for Wallingford in a by-election to the Cavalier Parliament. He owed a lot of his influence to his brother, Henry Bennet, 1st Earl of Arlington. He was created Lord Ossulston, Baron Ossulston on 24 November 1682. Ossulston is the name of a hundred of the ceremonial county of Middlesex. His wife, Bridget, was a noted book collector.

He supported the Glorious Revolution of 1688 and signed the petition for a free Parliament and the declaration to the Prince of Orange, but was reckoned among the opposition peers in 1690.

Lord Ossulton died at the age of about 78 and was buried at Harlington.

Family
Bennet was married twice, first to Elizabeth, widow of Edmund Sheffield, 2nd Earl of Mulgrave and daughter of Lionel Cranfield, 1st Earl of Middlesex and his wife Elizabeth Shepherd. They had no children.  His second wife was Bridget Howe, daughter of John Grubham Howe of Langar and his wife Annabella Scrope, daughter of Emanuel Scrope, 1st Earl of Sunderland. They had two children Charles, who was given the title Earl of Tankerville and Annabella (1682–1698). Bridget was notable as a collector of books.  Henry Bennet, 1st Earl of Arlington.

References 

1618 births
1695 deaths
Barons in the Peerage of England
Peers of England created by Charles II
Alumni of Pembroke College, Oxford
Members of Gray's Inn
Knights of the Bath
English MPs 1661–1679